Roccaraso is a town and comune in central Italy, in the province of L'Aquila in the Abruzzo region.

History

Founding 
The town of Roccaraso dates back to around 975 AD, and is located near the Rasinus stream, from which some believe it took its original name, Rocca Rasini. It developed as a farming village, inhabited by herdsmen and craftsmen, which guaranteed its people a peaceful and prosperous life. During the late 19th century, the opening of the rail link with Naples begins to bring the first tourists, attracted by the beauty of the natural environment, who were soon welcomed by various hotels that at that time were beginning to rise.

World War Two 
A sharp setback came with the Second World War. Roccaraso was located right on the head of the Gustav line, the system of fortifications with which the Germans tried to stop the advance of the Allies after the landing at Salerno in September 1943. The town was completely destroyed by a bombing, which caused the loss of 'Interalia', a theater built in 1698, one of the oldest in Italy. The roccolani did not lose heart; after the end of the war the town returned to everyday life and soon became one of the most popular tourist destinations in Italy.

Roccaraso's Frazione of Pietransieri is among the villages decorated for Valor for the War of Liberation that has been awarded the Gold Medal of Military Valour for the sacrifices of its people (which culminated in the Limmari Massacre) and its activities in the partisan struggle during the Second World War.

Main sights 
Church of Santa Maria Assunta
Medieval town of Pietransieri
Church of San Rocco

Ski resort Roccaraso 

The first ski race was held in 1910 and the first ski lift was the 'Slittovia' in Monte Zurrone, built in 1936. Numerous competitions, both national and international, are held every year. In March 2005, Roccaraso hosted the men's and women's finals of the European Cup, and the World Junior Championships in 2012. The participants, representing dozens of countries from all five continents, contended areas laurels of victory. But only eleven teams were able to savour the joy of the podium. In particular, Norway has dominated the race winning 4 gold, 3 silver, and 1 bronze. Italy settled for a silver medal obtained in the team event, the parallel team played on the Gran track Pizzalto, where blue colors were represented by Alex Zingerle, Giordano Ronci, and Pichler.

During the 1950s and 1960s US servicemen and their families enjoyed the recreation facilities especially riding "saucers"; like riding on a metal trash can lid.

Notable people
Domenico Angeloni (1732–1817) Italian priest, theologist, and mathematician

References

External links

Inside Abruzzo: Insider Tips Uncovered
Roccaraso
ASIpress - news from Roccaraso